The 2022–23 Loyola Greyhounds men's basketball team represented Loyola University Maryland in the 2022–23 NCAA Division I men's basketball season. The Greyhounds, led by fifth-year head coach Tavaras Hardy, played their home games at Reitz Arena in Baltimore, Maryland as members of the Patriot League. They finished the season 13–20, 7–11 in Patriot League play to finish in a four-way tie for sixth place. As the No. 8 seed in the Patriot League tournament, they defeated Holy Cross in the first round before losing to Colgate in the quarterfinals.

Previous season
The Greyhounds finished the 2021–22 season 14–16, 8–10 in Patriot League play to finish in sixth place. They were defeated by Boston University in the quarterfinals of the Patriot League tournament.

Roster

Schedule and results

|-
!colspan=12 style=| Exhibition

|-
!colspan=12 style=| Non-conference regular season

|-
!colspan=12 style=| Patriot League regular season

|-
!colspan=9 style=| Patriot League tournament

|-

Sources

References

Loyola Greyhounds men's basketball seasons
Loyola Greyhounds
Loyola Greyhounds men's basketball
Loyola Greyhounds men's basketball